In some versions of the Ramayana such as the Krittivasi Ramayana, Mahiravana, also called Ahiravana, is a rakshasa ruler of Patala. He is variously described as either an ally or a brother of the rakshasa king Ravana. He secretly carried away Rama and his brother Lakshmana to the nether-world, consulted his friends, and decided to sacrifice the life of the two divine brothers at the altar of his chosen deity, goddess Mahamaya. However, Hanuman saved their lives by decapitating Mahiravana, and destroying his army.

Popular culture
The Mairavan charitra was written in Telugu in Kavya style in the 16th century by Adithya kavi.

The story of Mahiravana was made into a Telugu film in 1940 by Ghantasala Balaramaiah entitled Mahiravana. The veteran actor Vemuri Gaggaiah played the role of Mahiravana. The legend was also featured in the 2018 animated film Hanuman vs Mahiravana, released in Hindi and Tamil.

See also
 Adbhuta Ramayana

References

Rakshasa in the Ramayana